Todsaporn Sri-reung (born March 18, 1990) is a Thai professional footballer who plays as a goalkeeper.

Honours

Club
BEC Tero Sasana
 Thai League Cup (1): 2014
 Toyota Premier Cup (1): 2015

External links

1990 births
Living people
Todsaporn Sri-reung
Todsaporn Sri-reung
Association football goalkeepers
Todsaporn Sri-reung
Todsaporn Sri-reung
Todsaporn Sri-reung
Todsaporn Sri-reung
Todsaporn Sri-reung
Todsaporn Sri-reung
Todsaporn Sri-reung
Todsaporn Sri-reung
Todsaporn Sri-reung
Todsaporn Sri-reung
Todsaporn Sri-reung